Fallow is the stage of crop rotation in which the land is deliberately not used to raise a crop.

Fallow may also refer to:

 Fallow (Fanny Lumsden album), 2020
 Fallow (The Weakerthans album), 1997
 Fallow (color), a pale brown color

See also
 Fallow deer, a ruminant mammal
 Follow (disambiguation)
 Fallows, a surname